Laurence John Fishburne III (born July 30, 1961), usually credited as Larry Fishburne until 1993, is an American actor and producer. He is a three time Emmy Award and Tony Award winning actor known for his roles on stage and screen. He has been hailed for his forceful, militant, and authoritative characters in his films. He is known for playing Morpheus in The Matrix series (1999–2003), Jason "Furious" Styles in the John Singleton drama film Boyz n the Hood (1991), Tyrone "Mr. Clean" Miller in Francis Ford Coppola's war film Apocalypse Now (1979), and "The Bowery King" in the John Wick film series (2017–present).

For his portrayal of Ike Turner in What's Love Got to Do With It (1993), Fishburne was nominated for an Academy Award for Best Actor. He won a Tony Award for Best Featured Actor in a Play for his performance in Two Trains Running (1992), and an Emmy Award for Outstanding Guest Actor in a Drama Series for his performance in TriBeCa (1993). Fishburne became the first African American to portray Othello on film when he appeared in Oliver Parker's 1995 film adaptation of the Shakespeare play. He has also received five Screen Actors Guild Award nominations. He received an Independent Spirit Award for Best Male Lead nomination for his performance in Deep Cover (1992).

Other film credits of Fishburne include Steven Spielberg's The Color Purple (1985), Spike Lee's School Daze (1988), Abel Ferrara's King of New York (1990), Clint Eastwood's Mystic River (2003), Steven Soderbergh's Contagion (2011), and Richard Linklater's Last Flag Flying (2017). He has also gained a wider audience with the blockbuster films Man of Steel (2013), Batman v Superman: Dawn of Justice (2016), and Ant-Man and the Wasp (2018). On television, he starred as Dr. Raymond Langston on the CBS crime drama CSI: Crime Scene Investigation (2008–2011), as Special Agent Jack Crawford in the NBC thriller series Hannibal (2013–2015), and as Earl "Pops" Johnson in the ABC sitcom Black-ish (2014–2022). He is currently starring in the Broadway revival of David Mamet's play American Buffalo alongside Sam Rockwell and Darren Criss.

Early life 
Fishburne was born in Augusta, Georgia, the son of Hattie Bell (née Crawford), a junior high school mathematics and science teacher, and Laurence John Fishburne, Jr., a juvenile corrections officer. After his parents divorced during his childhood, he moved with his mother to Brooklyn, New York, where he was raised. His father saw him once a month. Fishburne is a graduate of Lincoln Square Academy in New York, which closed in the 1980s.

Career

1972–1989 
For most of his early career, he was credited as Larry Fishburne. In 1972, at the age of 11, Fishburne received positive reviews for his first acting role in the initial ABC Theater teleplay If You Give a Dance You Gotta Pay the Band. Soon after, Fishburne portrayed Joshua Hall on the ABC soap opera One Life to Live. His most memorable childhood role was in Cornbread, Earl and Me, in which he played a young boy who witnessed the police shooting of a popular high school basketball star. He later earned a supporting role in Apocalypse Now, in which he played Tyrone Miller, a cocky 17-year-old Gunner's Mate 3rd Class from the Bronx, nicknamed Mr. Clean. When production began in March 1976, he was just 14 years old, having lied about his age to get the part. Filming took so long that he actually was 17 years old upon its completion.

Fishburne spent much of the 1980s in and out of television and periodically on stage. In the early 1980s, he worked as a bouncer at punk rock clubs, such as Cathay de Grande. He appeared in the early 1980s movies Band of the Hand, Death Wish 2 and The Cotton Club, and had a minor role in the critically acclaimed Steven Spielberg film The Color Purple. Fishburne had a recurring role as Cowboy Curtis on Paul Reubens' CBS children's television series Pee-wee's Playhouse. He also appeared in the M*A*S*H episode, "The Tooth Shall Set You Free". In Spenser: For Hire, he was a guest star for the second-season episode "Personal Demons". He also appeared alongside Kevin Bacon in Quicksilver. His stage work during the 1980s included Short Eyes (1984), and Loose Ends (1987), both produced at Second Stage Theatre in New York City. Also in 1987 he played a part in the third A Nightmare on Elm Street film as a hospital orderly. Fishburne featured in Red Heat (1988) beside Arnold Schwarzenegger and James Belushi. Fishburne also starred as "Dap" in Spike Lee's School Daze (1988). Fishburne's character was a depiction of an African American, culturally inclined college student at a historically black college.

1990–2007 

In 1990, Fishburne played Jimmy Jump in the controversial King of New York, and in 1991, starred in Boyz n the Hood. The following year, in 1992, he won a Tony Award for his stage performance in the August Wilson play Two Trains Running and an Emmy Award for his performance in the opening episode, "The Box," of the short-lived anthology series television drama TriBeCa. He also starred in Deep Cover alongside Jeff Goldblum. In 1993, he received his first Oscar nomination for his portrayal of Ike Turner in What's Love Got to Do With It. Fishburne won an Image Award for "Outstanding Supporting Actor in a Motion Picture" for his performance as West Indian Professor Maurice Phipps in the 1995 American drama ensemble film, Higher Learning. He played the title role in Othello, the second African-American actor, after Paul Robeson, to perform the role. In 1997, Fishburne starred in the science fiction horror Event Horizon alongside Sam Neill. Fishburne is perhaps best known for his role as Morpheus, the hacker-mentor of Neo, played by Keanu Reeves, in the 1999 blockbuster science fiction film The Matrix.

Fishburne provided the voice of Thrax in Osmosis Jones in 2001. He reprised his role as Morpheus in the Matrix sequels The Matrix Reloaded, and The Matrix Revolutions in 2003. He briefly featured as a stretcher-bearer in one version of the video for The Spooks' song "Things I've Seen" (2000) and appeared with Tom Cruise as Theodore Brassell, IMF superior of Cruise's character in Mission: Impossible III. Fishburne has worked with actress Angela Bassett on four projects. He said that "An electrifying thing happens when the two of us work together. I haven't experienced it with anyone else. A freedom happens when we work together." In 2006, they appeared onstage in a Pasadena Playhouse production of August Wilson's Fences. He played terrorist leader, Ahmat who was revealed to be CIA in the 2006 film Five Fingers.

He provided the voice of the narrator in the 2007 Teenage Mutant Ninja Turtles film, TMNT, which was a commercial success. The same year, he provided the voice of the Silver Surfer in 2007 film Fantastic Four: Rise of the Silver Surfer. On February 24, 2007, Fishburne was honored with the Harvard Foundation's Artist of the Year award at the annual show Cultural Rhythms. He received this honor for his achievements as an actor and entertainer and for his humanitarian pursuits. Fishburne is a UNICEF ambassador.

2008–present 
In April 2008, Fishburne returned to the stage in the Broadway production of Thurgood, a new play by George Stevens, Jr. Thurgood opened at the Booth Theatre on April 30, 2008. He won the Drama Desk Award for Outstanding One-Person Show for his performance. On February 24, 2011, HBO screened a filmed version of the play performed at the John F. Kennedy Center for the Performing Arts. On February 16, 2011, the White House hosted a screening of the film as part of its celebrations of Black History Month.

On August 18, 2008, it was reported that Laurence Fishburne would join the cast of CSI: Crime Scene Investigation after William Petersen, who played Gil Grissom, left the series. John Malkovich was also considered for the role prior to the announcement. Fishburne joined the show on the ninth episode of the 9th season as a college professor and former pathologist whose area of expertise involves some criminals' predisposition to commit acts of violence. The character was introduced as a consultant on a case ("19 Down"), who winds up joining the CSI team ("One to Go"). In May 2009, Fishburne performed on-stage in the National Memorial Day Concert on the Mall in Washington, D.C.

Fishburne starred in Predators in 2010 and Contagion in 2011. On June 7, 2011, Fishburne announced that he was leaving CSI to return to movies and theatre, opting not to renew his contract and would not appear in Season 12. Fishburne played Perry White in the Zack Snyder-directed Superman reboot Man of Steel (2013). In 2013, Fishburne joined the cast of Hannibal, as Dr. Jack Crawford, head of Behavioral Sciences at the FBI. In 2014, Fishburne reprised his role as Morpheus in a series of Kia K900 commercials. In 2015, Fishburne joined the ABC sitcom Black-ish in the recurring role of Pops; Fishburne is also an executive producer on the show. Fishburne also serves as an executive producer for the Freeform sitcom Grown-ish, a spin-off series to Black-ish.

In 2016, Fishburne reprised his role as White in the sequel Batman v Superman: Dawn of Justice and appeared in the science fiction/romance movie Passengers.

In June 2017, Fishburne's production company, Cinema Gypsy Productions, signed a two-year overall deal at ABC Studios.

In 2017, he appeared in the neo-noir action thriller film John Wick: Chapter 2 as The Bowery King, in his first collaboration with Keanu Reeves since The Matrix trilogy. Also in 2017, Fishburne starred in the comedy-drama Last Flag Flying, as the character Rev. Richard Mueller. In 2018, Fishburne played Bill Foster in Marvel's Ant-Man and the Wasp, directed by Peyton Reed. The film was released July 6. Fishburne served as co-creator and executive producer in the Marvel Animation/Disney Television Animation series Moon Girl and Devil Dinosaur. He also appeared in the series as the Beyonder.

Personal life 
Fishburne married actress Hajna O. Moss in 1985, in New York. They have two children, son Langston (born 1987) and daughter Montana Fishburne (born 1991). Hajna and Laurence divorced in the 1990s.

Fishburne dated actress Victoria Dillard from 1992 to 1995.

Fishburne met actress Gina Torres and they were engaged in February 2001 and married on September 22, 2002, at The Cloisters museum in New York City. On January 8, 2007, Fishburne's spokesman Alan Nierob announced the couple were expecting their first child together. A daughter, Delilah, was born to the couple in June 2007. 

On September 20, 2017, it was confirmed that Torres and Fishburne were separated and had been keeping the separation private for the last year. Fishburne filed for divorce on November 2, 2017, and the divorce was finalized effective May 11, 2018, after Torres and Fishburne reached a final settlement on April 16, 2018.

Fishburne lives in Hollywood, and also maintains a residence in New York City, in the Castle Village Co-Op in the Hudson Heights section of Washington Heights. He is a fan of Brazilian author Paulo Coelho and plans to produce a movie based on his novel The Alchemist.

Filmography

Awards and nominations

References

External links 

 
 
 
 

1961 births
20th-century American male actors
21st-century American male actors
African-American male actors
African-American male child actors
American male child actors
American male film actors
American male soap opera actors
American male stage actors
American male television actors
American male voice actors
Drama Desk Award winners
Film producers from New York (state)
Living people
Male actors from Augusta, Georgia
Male actors from Georgia (U.S. state)
Male actors from New York City
People from Washington Heights, Manhattan
Primetime Emmy Award winners
Tony Award winners
Writers from Augusta, Georgia
20th-century African-American people
21st-century African-American people